Simpang Empat or Simpang Ampat or Sempang Ampat (Malay or Indonesian for "Four Corners") may refer to:

Malaysia
Simpang Empat, Kedah
Simpang Ampat (Malacca)
Simpang Ampat, Seberang Perai
Simpang Empat (Semanggol), Perak
Simpang Empat, Perak
Simpang Empat, Perlis
Simpang Empat (state constituency), represented in the Perlis State Legislative Assembly

Indonesia
Simpang Ampek, West Sumatra (occasionally known as Simpang Empat)
Simpang Empat, Karo Regency, North Sumatra